The following is a list of Israeli people and films that have been nominated for or won Academy Awards.

Best Actor in a Leading Role

Best Actress in a Leading Role

Best Actress in a Supporting Role

Best Picture

Best Original Screenplay

Best Animated Feature

Best Documentary Feature

Best Documentary Short Film

Best Live Action Short

Best Sound

Best International Film

The following films were submitted by the country of Israel for Best International Feature Film and received a nomination.

Nominations and Winners

References

Lists of Academy Award winners and nominees by nationality or region
Cinema of Israel